Yeganeh (also Romanized as Yegāneh; also known as Yekāneh) is a village in Sangestan Rural District, in the Central District of Hamadan County, Hamadan Province, Iran. At the 2006 census, its population was 427, in 115 families.

References 

Populated places in Hamadan County